Do You Like It Here Now, Are You Settling In? is the fourth album by the Welsh rock band Man and was released in November 1971. The album was recorded in August at Charles and Kingsley Ward's Rockfield Studios near Monmouth in Southeastern Wales. Sessions took place soon after the renowned 'All Good Clean Fun' tour of Switzerland, although a brief break in the hectic German tour schedule during the late spring had resulted in two tracks being written at a studio in Swansea, Wales. Critical reaction to the new album was positive. The album title is apparently a Swansea saying, usually directed at pub landlords of exceptionally long standing.

Reception 
Critical reaction to the new album was positive, with encouraging suggestions of a band on the verge of breaking into the big time.

Track listing 
All titles composed by Man.

Personnel 
 Michael "Micky" Jones – electric guitar, acoustic guitar, vocals
 Roger "Deke" Leonard – electric guitar, acoustic guitar, vocals
 Clive John – organ, piano, vocals
 Martin Ace – bass guitar, acoustic guitar, vocals
 Terry Williams – drums

Production
 Engineers – Kingsley "Bass Drum" Ward, Rip van Ralph (Ralph Down), Edmundo Razz (Dave Edmunds)
 Mixing engineer – George Chkiantz

References

External links 
 Man - Do You Like It Here Now, Are You Settling In? (1971) album review by Stewart Mason, credits & releases at AllMusic.com
 
 Man - Do You Like It Here Now, Are You Settling In? (1971) album credits & user reviews at ProgArchives.com
 Man - Do You Like It Here Now, Are You Settling In? (1971) album to be listened as stream at Spotify.com

1971 albums
Man (band) albums
United Artists Records albums
Albums produced by Deke Leonard
Albums produced by Terry Williams (drummer)
Albums recorded at Rockfield Studios